
The CWA New Blood Dagger is an annual award given by the British Crime Writers' Association (CWA) for first books by previously unpublished writers. It is given in memory of CWA founder John Creasey and was previously known as The John Creasey Memorial Award. Publisher Chivers Press was the sponsor from the award's introduction in 1973 to 2002. BBC Audiobooks was the sponsor in 2003.

Winners
1973 –	Kyril Bonfiglioli, Don't Point That Thing at Me
1974 –	Roger L. Simon, The Big Fix
1975 –	Sara George, Acid Drop
1976 –	Patrick Alexander, Death of a Thin-Skinned Animal
1977 –	Jonathan Gash, The Judas Pair
1978 –	Paula Gosling, A Running Duck
1979 –	David Serafin, Saturday of Glory
1980 –	Liza Cody, Dupe
1981 –	James Leigh, The Ludi Victory
1982 –	Eric Wright, The Night the Gods Smiled
1983 –	Carol Clemeau, The Ariadne Clue
1984 –	Elizabeth Ironside, A Very Private Enterprise
1985 –	Robert Richards, The Latimer Mercy
1986 –	Neville Steed, Tinplate
1987 –	Denis Kilcommons, Dark Apostle
1988 –	Janet Neel, Death's Bright Angel
1989 –	Annette Roome, A Real Shot in the Arm
1990 –	Patricia Cornwell, Postmortem
1991 –	Walter Mosley, Devil in a Blue Dress
1992 –	Minette Walters, The Ice House
1993 –	no award 
1994 –	Doug J. Swanson, Big Town
1995 –	Janet Evanovich, One for the Money; Laurie R. King, A Grave Talent
1996 –	no award 
1997 –	Paul Johnston, Body Politic
1998 –	Denise Mina, Garnethill
1999 –	Dan Fesperman, Lie in the Dark
2000 –	Boston Teran, God Is a Bullet
2001 –	Susanna Jones, The Earthquake Bird
2002 –	Louise Welsh, The Cutting Room
2003 –	William Landay, Mission Flats
2004 –	Mark Mills, Amagansett
2005 –	Dreda Say Mitchell, Running Hot
2006 –	Louise Penny, Still Life
2007 –	Gillian Flynn, Sharp Objects
2008 –	Matt Rees, The Bethlehem Murders
2009 – Johan Theorin, Echoes from the Dead
2010 – Ryan David Jahn, Acts of Violence
2011 – S. J. Watson, Before I Go to Sleep
2012 – Wiley Cash, A Land More Kind than Home
2013 – Derek B. Miller, Norwegian by Night
2014 – Ray Celestin, The Axeman's Jazz
2015 – Smith Henderson, Fourth of July
2016 – Bill Beverly, Dodgers
2017 – Chris Whitaker, Tall Oaks
2018 – Melissa Scrivner Love, Lola
2019 – Chris Hammer, Scrublands
2020 – Trevor Wood, The Man on the Street
2021 – Eva Björg Ægisdóttir, The Creak on the Stairs

References

External links
Crime Writers' Association website

Blood
First book awards
1973 establishments in the United Kingdom
Awards established in 1973